Legislative elections were held in France on 20 August and 3 September 1893. The Republicans were victorious and gained an increased majority, and President Sadi Carnot invited Jean Casimir-Perier to form a government. However, there was increasing tension between the Radicals and the Moderates in the ruling coalition, which had manifested itself in the passage of a protectionist tariff law with right-wing support in January 1892.

After the elections, following the bombing of the Chamber of Deputies by the anarchist Auguste Vaillant on 9 December 1893, Casimir-Perier rushed through the lois scélérates with the support of the Right.

Casimir-Perier was elected to the presidency on 24 June 1894, following the assassination of President Carnot by the Italian anarchist Sante Geronimo Caserio. In January 1895, however, he resigned, and was replaced by Félix Faure, again with the support of the Right.

Casimir-Perier's government was followed by a series of moderate governments with right-wing support under Charles Dupuy, Alexandre Ribot and Jules Méline – with the short-lived exception of the government of Radical Léon Bourgeois (November 1895 – April 1896).

Results

References

External links
Map of Deputies elected in 1893 according to their group in the House, including overseas (in french)

Legislative elections in France
France
Legislative
France
France